Kysucký Lieskovec (until 1899 ) is a village and municipality in Kysucké Nové Mesto District in the Zilina Region of northern Slovakia

History
In historical records the village was first mentioned in 1438

Geography
The municipality lies at an altitude of 376 metres and covers an area of 12.320 km². It has a population of about 2347 people.

References

External links
https://web.archive.org/web/20080111223415/http://www.statistics.sk/mosmis/eng/run.html Dead link

Villages and municipalities in Kysucké Nové Mesto District